Ghamaila is a subdivision of the Kurmi caste. They are a large class of farmers in central portions of Bihar in South of river Ganges.

Following district of Bihar.

 Nalanda
 Patna
 Nawada
 Gaya
 Jamui
 Jahanabaad
 Munger

And few are also present in metro cities like Delhi.

References 

Indian castes
Social groups of Bihar